This is a list of awards and nominations received by Swazi-English actor Richard E. Grant.

Major associations

Academy Awards

British Academy Film Awards

Golden Globe Awards

Screen Actors Guild Awards

Other awards and nominations

AARP Movies for Grownups Awards

Alliance of Women Film Journalists

Austin Film Critics Association

Boston Society of Film Critics

Boston Online Film Critics

Chicago Film Critics Association

Columbus Film Critics Association

Critics' Choice Movie Awards

Dallas–Fort Worth Film Critics Association

Denver Film Critics Society

Detroit Film Critics Society

Dorian Awards

Florida Film Critics Circle

Georgia Film Critics Association

Golden Raspberry Award

Gotham Independent Film Awards

Greater Western New York Film Critics

Hawaii Film Critics Society

Houston Film Critics Society

Independent Spirit Awards

Kansas City Film Critics Circle

London Film Critics' Circle

Los Angeles Online Film Critics Society

Music City Film Critics Association

National Board of Review

National Society of Film Critics

Nevada Film Critics Society

New York Film Critics Circle

New York Film Critics Online

North Carolina Film Critics Association

Online Film Critics Society

Online Association of Female Film Critics

Philadelphia Film Critics Circle

Phoenix Critics Circle

Phoenix Film Critics Society

San Diego Film Critics Society

San Francisco Film Critics Circle

Satellite Awards

Seattle Film Critics Society

Southeastern Film Critics Association

St. Louis Gateway Film Critics Association

Vancouver Film Critics Circle

Washington D.C. Area Film Critics Association

References

External links
 

Grant, Richard E